Siege of Annapolis Royal may refer to:

 Siege of Annapolis Royal (1711)
 Siege of Annapolis Royal (1744)
 Siege of Annapolis Royal (1745)